The following is a timeline of the history of the city of Austin, Texas, USA.

19th century

 1839
 Austin designated capital of the Republic of Texas.
 Waller Plan is developed as Austin's first city plan.
 December 27: Austin incorporated.
 1840
 Edwin Waller becomes first mayor.
 1841
 Houston-Austin coach begins operating.
 Austin Lyceum active.
 French Legation built.
 1842 - Texas seat of government relocated from Austin to Houston.
 1845 - Austin becomes part of the new U.S. state of Texas.
 1846 - Texas seat of government relocated back to Austin from Houston.
 1850 - Population: 3,841.
 1854 - Swenson Building and Ziller Building constructed.
 1855
 Texas State Capitol built.
 St. David's Episcopal Church consecrated.
 1857 - General Land Office Building constructed.
 1859 - Buaas's Hall (assembly room) renovated.
 1860 - Wharton College opens.
 1871
 Houston and Texas Central Railroad begins operating.
 Democratic Statesman newspaper begins publication.
 1872
 Connectional High School and Institute founded.
 Penn's Circulating Library in business.
 1873 - Austin Library Association active.
 1874 - St. Mary's Academy founded.
 1875 - Austin City Railroad begins operating.
 1876 - International–Great Northern Railroad begins operating.
 1877
 Stuart Female Seminary founded.
 Tillotson College chartered.
 1878 - St. Edward's University founded.
 1881
 November 9: State Capitol building burns down.
 University of Texas at Austin established.
 Austin High School opens.
 1884 
 Congregation Beth Israel synagogue established.
 Servant Girl Annihilator murders begin (ending in 1885.)
 1885 - St. Edward's College established.
 1886
 Driskill Hotel in business.
 Hill City Quartet formed.
 1887 - Negro Deaf, Dumb, and Blind Institute opens.
 1888 - Texas State Capitol rebuilt.
 1894 - Heart's Ease Circle of King's Daughters (women's group) founded.
 1895 - Moonlight towers installed.
 1900
 April: Austin Dam failure.
 Samuel Huston College opens.

20th century

1900s-1940s

 1902 - Nixon-Clay College and Austin Presbyterian Theological Seminary established.
 1908 - Confederate Woman's Home opens.
 1910 - Congress Avenue Bridge rebuilt.
 1911 - Texas Fine Arts Association and International Alliance of Theatrical Stage Employees Local 205 established.
 1917 - University of Texas' School for Military Aeronautics opens.
 1918 - State Office Building constructed.
 1921 - Austin Civic Theatre founded.
 1923 - KNOW radio begins broadcasting.
 1926
 Council–manager form of government effected.
 University Airport in operation.
 1928
 1928 Austin city plan is delivered to City Council.
 1929 - Howson Community Center established.
 1930
 Municipal Airport opens.
 Population: 53,120.
 1933
 Austin Public Library building opens.
 State Highway Building constructed.

 1934
 O. Henry House museum opens.
 Junior League of Austin organized.
 1935
 Texas Federation of Women's Clubs Headquarters built.
 Flood.
 1937
 UT Tower built.
 KTBC radio begins broadcasting.
 Lyndon B. Johnson becomes U.S. representative for Texas's 10th congressional district.
 1938 - Montopolis Bridge built.
 1941 - Austin Daily Tribune Building constructed.
 1942
 Bergstrom Army Air Field established.
 Lamar Boulevard Bridge built.
 1947 - Roman Catholic Diocese of Austin established.

1950s-1990s

 1950 – Population: 132,459.
 1952
 KTBC-TV (television) begins broadcasting.
 Burnet Drive-In cinema opens.
 1953
 YMCA of Austin chartered.
 Travis High School opens in South Austin; McCallum High School opens in North Austin.
 1956 - Ballet Academy founded.
 1958
 Goodwill Industries of Central Texas established.
 Town & Country Food Stores in business.
 1959 - Palmer Auditorium opens.
 1960 – Population: 186,545.
 1961 — Lanier High School opens. Its name was changed to Juan Navarro High School in 2019.
 1962 - Austin Aqua Festival begins.
 1963 - Jake Pickle becomes U.S. representative for Texas's 10th congressional district.
 1965
 The Citizen newspaper in publication.
 Reagan High School opens. Its name was changed to Northeast High School beginning in the 2019-2020 school year.
 1966 - August 1: Whitman shootings.
 1967
 Vulcan Gas Company music venue active.
 Fair Housing Ordinance established.
 1968
 Crockett High School opens.
 Sister city relationship established with Saltillo, Mexico.
 1970
 Armadillo World Headquarters music venue active.
 University of Texas' LBJ School of Public Affairs established.
 Population: 251,808.
 1971 - Lyndon Baines Johnson Library and Museum dedicated.
 1973
 Austin Community College and regional Austin Transportation Study established.
 L.C. Anderson High School (Mesa Drive) and Aquarius cinema open.
 1975 - Austin Community Gardens created.
 1976 - Austin City Limits television music program begins national broadcast.
 1978 - Sister city relationship established with Maseru, Lesotho.
 1979
 Austin Public Library new main branch building opens.
 Austin Shambhala Center founded.
 1980
 Whole Foods Market in business.
 Population: 345,496.
 1981
 Capital Area Food Bank of Texas and Le Chef College of Hospitality Careers established.
 Austin Chronicle and Austin Press newspapers begin publication.
 Sister city relationship established with Lima, Peru.
 1982
 National Wildflower Research Center and La Peña arts group founded.
 Pennybacker Bridge opens.
 1983
 Austin History Center active.
 Austin Children's Museum established.
 Sister city relationship established with Adelaide, Australia.
 1984 - St. Michael's Catholic Academy established.
 1985
 Austin Film Society organized.
 Texas Hill Country Wine & Food Festival begins.
 1986
 Austin Lyric Opera founded.
 Sister city relationship established with Taichung, Taiwan.
 1987
 South by Southwest music festival begins.
 Lamar Smith becomes U.S. representative for Texas's 21st congressional district.
 1988
 Dell Computer Corporation in business.
 Bowie High School established.
 1990
 Sister city relationship established with Ōita City, Japan.
 Population: 465,622.
 1991 - Sister city relationship established with Koblenz, Germany.
 1992
 Austin Convention Center opens.
 Hyde Park Theatre founded.
 1993 - Sustainable Food Center and Dharma Drum Mountain Buddhist Association chapter founded.
 1994
 Um-Al-Mumeneen-Sayeda-Khadija Mosque built.
 Goodwill Computer Museum founded.
 1995
 Lloyd Doggett becomes U.S. representative for Texas's 10th congressional district.
 Ordinary Mind Zen Group formed.
 City website online.
 1997 - Sister city relationship established with Xishuangbanna, China.
 1998 - Linh-Son Buddhist Temple established.
 1999
 Austin–Bergstrom International Airport opens.
 Dell Foundation and Foodways of Austin club established.
 2000
 Akins High School established.
 George W. Bush presidential campaign, 2000 headquartered in Austin.
 Area of city: 251 square miles.
 Population: 656,562.
 Sister city relationship established with Orlu, Nigeria.

21st century

 2001 - Sister city relationship established with Gwangmyeong, South Korea.
 2002 - Texas Archive of the Moving Image headquartered in city.
 2002 - The inaugural Austin City Limits Music Festival is hosted in Zilker Park. 
 2003
 Texas Rollergirls founded.
 Frost Bank Tower built.
 2005 - Austin Film Critics Association founded.
 2009
 May: Austin mayoral election, 2009 held.
 Texas Tribune headquartered in city.
 Sister city relationship established with Antalya Kepez, Turkey.
 2010
 February 18: 2010 Austin suicide attack.
 Capital MetroRail begins operating.
 Austin Bulldog begins publication.
 Area of city: 297.90 square miles.
 Population: city 790,390; megaregion 19,728,244.
 2011 - Sister city relationship established with Angers, France.
 2012 - Austin Food & Wine Alliance established.
 2013 - Population: 885,400.
 2014
 November 28: Larry Steven McQuilliams, 49, fired at least 100 shots at several government buildings and a police station before dying of a gunshot wound.
 Sister city relationship established with Hackney, London.
 2018 - In March, a series of explosions centered in Austin killed two civilians and injuring another five.

See also
 History of Austin, Texas
 List of mayors of Austin, Texas
 National Register of Historic Places listings in Travis County, Texas
 Timeline of Texas
 Timelines of other cities in the Southeast Texas area of Texas: Beaumont, Houston, Pasadena

References

Bibliography

Published in 19th c.

Published in 20th c.
 
 
 
 
 
 Stuart MacCorkle, Austin's Three Forms of Government (San Antonio: Naylor, 1973). 
 
 Austin Human Relations Commission, Housing Patterns Study: Segregation and Discrimination in Austin, Texas (Austin, 1979). 
 
 Paul D. Lack, "Slavery and Vigilantism in Austin, Texas, 1840–1860," Southwestern Historical Quarterly 85 (July 1981). 
 David C. Humphrey, Austin: An Illustrated History (Northridge, California: Windsor, 1985). 
 Anthony M. Orum, Power, Money and the People: The Making of Modern Austin (Austin: Texas Monthly Press, 1987).
 David C. Humphrey, "A 'Muddy and Conflicting' View: The Civil War as Seen from Austin, Texas," Southwestern Historical Quarterly 94 (January 1991).

Published in 21st c.

External links

 
 Items related to Austin, Texas, various dates (via Digital Public Library of America)
 
 

 
austin